Ramsey County, a county that has a population of 526,714 (2013 estimate), has many county roads. The following is an incomplete list of county-maintained roads in Ramsey County, Minnesota, United States.

Lettered county roads

There are several county routes that follow roads marked with letters, such as "County B" or "County H2."
County Road B (County 25)
County Road B2 (County 24, County 78, County 111)
County Road C (County 23)
County Road C2 
County Road D (County 19)
County Road E (County 15, County 99)
County Road E2 (County 73)
County Road F (County 12, County 95)
County Road H (County 9)
County Road H2 (County 5)
County Road I (County 3)
County Road J (County 1, County 81)

Numbered Route list

See also
County roads in Minnesota

References

 
Ramsey